Cena was the main meal of the day in ancient Rome

Cena may also refer to:

People

 John Cena, an American professional wrestler and actor
 Marcone Cena, a Brazilian footballer

Geography

 Cena, Ozolnieki municipality, a village in Latvia
 Cena Parish, an administrative unit of Jelgava Municipality in the Semigallia region of Latvia.
 Cena River, a river in Latvia

In other languages

 The Spanish and Italian word for dinner
 The Czech and Slovak word for Price

Other

 Cena N641, a bomb detection dog in the US Marines

See also

 Cene (disambiguation)